Indrajit Coomaraswamy (born 3 April 1950) is a Sri Lankan economist and the 14th Governor of the Central Bank of Sri Lanka.

Early life and family
Coomaraswamy was born on 3 April 1950 in Colombo, Ceylon. He was the son of civil servant Rajendra Coomaraswamy (Roving Raju) and Wijeyamani. His paternal grandfather C. Coomaraswamy was a civil servant and his maternal grandfather S. K. Wijeyaratnam was chairman of Negombo Urban Council. He has one sister, Radhika. Coomaraswamy was educated at Royal College, Colombo and at Harrow School. He was captain of Royal's primary cricket team. He was captain of Harrow's cricket team from 1967 to 1968 and also played rugby for the school for three years. After school he joined Emmanuel College, Cambridge from where he received BA (Hons) and MA degrees. He played first-class cricket for Cambridge University Cricket Club between 1971 and 1972. He then proceeded to the University of Sussex from where he obtained a DPhil degree.

Coomaraswamy is married to Tara de Fonseka. They have two sons – Imran and Arjun. Coomaraswamy is a Sri Lankan Tamil.

Career
Coomaraswamy joined the Central Bank of Sri Lanka in 1973, working as a staff officer in its Economic Research, Statistics and Bank Supervision divisions until 1989. He was seconded to the Ministry of Finance and Planning between 1981 and 1989 to provide advice on macroeconomic issues and structural reforms. He worked at the Commonwealth Secretariat from 1990 to 2008, holding various posts including Chief Officer, Economics in the International Finance and Markets Section; Director of the Economic Affairs Division; and Deputy-Director of the Secretary-General's Office. He was an advisor to Prime Minister Ranil Wickremesinghe and Project Minister of Economic Reforms, Science and Technology Milinda Moragoda between 2001 and 2002.

Coomaraswamy rejoined the Commonwealth Secretariat in 2010 as Interim Director of its Social Transformation Programme Division. He was special advisor to the controversial Galleon Group hedge fund. He was director of a British company called Galleon Research Services Limited, a wholly owned subsidiary of Galleon International Management LLC. He was appointed as a non-executive director of John Keells Holdings PLC in February 2011. He was appointed as a director of Tokyo Cement Group in March 2011. He worked briefly for Hatton National Bank and was a director of SEEDS (Guarantee) Limited. He was a member of the University of Sri Jayewardenepura's Board of Study (Public Administration) and a director of Nawaloka College of Higher Studies. He was later a senior advisor to Minister of Development Strategies and International Trade Malik Samarawickrama.

Coomaraswamy was appointed Governor of the Central Bank of Sri Lanka in July 2016, replacing Arjuna Mahendran whose tenure was mired by allegations of corruption.

Sports career
Coomaraswamy played rugby for Ceylonese Rugby & Football Club and captained the national team in the 1974 Rugby Asiad. He also played cricket for the Tamil Union Cricket and Athletic Club.

References

1950 births
Alumni of Emmanuel College, Cambridge
Alumni of Royal College, Colombo
Alumni of the University of Sussex
Cambridge University cricketers
English people of Sri Lankan Tamil descent
Governors of the Central Bank of Sri Lanka
Living people
People educated at Harrow School
People from Colombo
Sri Lankan cricketers
Sri Lankan rugby union players
Sri Lankan Tamil bankers
Sri Lankan economists
Sri Lankan Tamil sportspeople